Guy Mazeline (12 April 1900 Le Havre – 25 May 1996 Boulogne-Billancourt) was a French writer, winner of the prix Goncourt in 1932 for his novel Les Loups, surprisingly winning against Voyage au bout de la nuit by Louis-Ferdinand Céline. 

He is the son of Alphonse Mazeline and Elise Hélène Suzanne Jaquereau.
He married on 18 December 1924, to Claire Louise Dors (7 June 1901 Nevers).

Works
 Piège du démon, 1927
 Porte close, 1928
 Un royaume près de la mer, 1931
 Les Loups, 1932
 Le Capitaine Durban, 1934
 Le Délire, 1935
 Les Îles du matin, 1936
 Bêtafeu, 1937
 Le Panier flottant, 1938
 Scènes de la vie hitlérienne, 1938
 Pied d'alouette, 1941
 La Femme donnée en gages, 1943
 Tony l'accordeur, 1943
 Un dernier coup de griffe, 1944
 Le Souffle de l'été, 1946
 Valfort, 1951
 Chrétienne compagnie, 1958
 Un amour d'Italie, 1967

English Translations
 The wolves''; translated from the French by Eric Sutton. New York, The Macmillan company, 1934.

References

1900 births
1996 deaths
Burials at Montparnasse Cemetery
Prix Goncourt winners
Writers from Le Havre
20th-century French novelists
French male novelists
20th-century French male writers